The Tomb of Bakhtiyar Khan is a tomb located in the Kaimur district of the Indian state of Bihar. It is a monument of national importance.

History 
The tomb inscription does not contain a date of construction. From the style of construction, it can be inferred that it was built during the same period as the Tomb of Sher Shah Suri. It is generally accepted that it was constructed between the 16th and 17th centuries.

Architecture 
It is an example of Indo-Islamic architecture. The tomb is an octagonal building, situated on a low plinth. The gateway is on the Eastern side of the tomb.

The tomb inscription contains verses from the Quran. There are about thirty graves within the tomb. In addition, there are some graves in the outer courtyard.

Location 
It is located on the outskirts of Chainpur, a few kilometres west of the district headquarters Bhabua.

See also 

 List of monuments of national importance in Bihar

References 

Tombs in India
Monuments of National Importance in Bihar